A pinto horse has a coat color that consists of large patches of white and any other color. The distinction between "pinto" and "solid" can be tenuous, as so-called "solid" horses frequently have areas of white hair. Various cultures throughout history appear to have selectively bred for pinto patterns.

Many breeds of horses carry pinto patterns. Pinto coloring, known simply as "coloured" in nations using British English, is the most popular in the United States. While pinto-colored horses are not considered as a "breed", several competing color breed registries have formed to encourage the breeding of pinto-colored horses. The word "paint" was sometimes used to describe pinto horses. In current usage, "paint" is specifically used for the American Paint Horse (APHA), which is a pinto-colored horse with identifiable American Quarter Horse or Thoroughbred bloodlines. 

Pinto patterns are visually and genetically distinct from the leopard complex spotting patterns characteristic of horse breeds such as the Appaloosa. Breeders who select for color are often careful not to cross the two patterns, and registries that include spotting color preferences often refuse registration to horses that exhibit characteristics of the "wrong" pattern.

Origins
The word pinto is Spanish for "painted", "dappled", or "spotted".

While pinto coloration has yet to be identified as a wildtype by DNA studies or seen in cave art antedating horse domestication, images from pottery and other art of ancient antiquity show horses with flashy, spotted patterns, indicating that they may have been desirable traits and selectively bred for. Images of spotted horses appear in the art of Ancient Egypt, and archaeologists have found evidence of horses with spotted coat patterns on the Russian steppes before the rise of the Roman Empire. Later, spotted horses were among those brought to the Americas by the conquistadores.

By the 17th century in Europe, spotted horses were quite fashionable, though when the fad ended, large numbers of newly unsellable horses were shipped to the Americas, some of which were sold, while others were simply turned loose to run wild. The color became popular, particularly among Native Americans, and was specifically bred for in the United States, which now has the greatest number of pinto horses in the world.

Color patterns and genetics of pinto horses

A number of words describe the various color and spotting patterns of pinto horses. Essentially, a pinto horse is genetically created when an allele for a spotting pattern is present. The genes that create the underlying base coat color are not related to the genes that create white spotting. The precise mechanisms that create spotting are not all fully understood, but those that are known often have human parallels, such as piebaldism. What horse terminology describes as "pinto" or "coloured" has been called leucism or "partial albinism" by pigment researchers. Common terms for describing different types of pinto horses include:

Colors
Piebald: More commonly used in nations using British English (BE), it is any pinto pattern on a black base coat, thus a black-and-white spotted horse.
Skewbald: More commonly used in nations using BE, it is any pinto pattern on any base coat other than black; as chestnut and bay are the most common base coat colors, skewbalds are most often chestnut and white or bay and white. At one time, the term may have applied more specifically to brown-looking pinto horses, but today it encompasses any color other than black.
Coloured: The term for pinto coloration in nations using BE, it includes both piebald and skewbald.
Tricolored or tricoloured: In BE, it is a term for a horse with three colors (usually bay and white). It is usually incorporated into the term skewbald.

Patterns
Tobiano: The most common type of pinto, tobiano is a spotting pattern characterized by rounded markings with white legs and white across the back between the withers and the dock of the tail, usually arranged in a roughly vertical pattern and more white than dark, though the ideal is a 50-50 distribution, with the head usually dark, having markings also seen on a nonpinto horse. i.e. star, snip, strip, or blaze. Tobiano is a simple dominant trait caused by a single gene, so all tobiano horses have at least one tobiano parent. A DNA test exists for tobiano. It is not associated with any health concerns.
Overo: A collective term used primarily by the APHA, overo essentially means "pinto, but not tobiano". It denotes patterns produced by at least three different genetic mechanisms: frame, splashed white, or sabino, described below. These patterns are usually characterized by irregular markings with more jagged edges than tobiano markings. The white rarely crosses the back. While some currently identified overo patterns appear to be dominant or incomplete dominant traits, overo-patterned foals (called "cropouts") are occasionally produced from two apparently solid-colored parents.
Frame or frame overo: Frame is a popular and easily recognized type of nontobiano pinto. This spotting pattern, in the absence of genes for other patterns, is characterized by horizontally oriented white patches with jagged, crisp edges. White patches typically include the head, face, and lateral aspects of the neck and body, and the eyes can be blue. Frame overos may have very modest markings that are not obviously pinto. This quality allows the pattern to seemingly "hide" for generations, and is thought to be responsible for some cases of cropouts. Frame is an incompletely dominant trait for which a DNA test is available; those without any copies of the "frame gene" (strictly, an allele) (N/N) do not possess this pattern, while those with a single copy (N/O) usually exhibit frame patterning (though sometimes in a very minimal form). Foals born with two copies (O/O), though, have lethal white syndrome and die shortly after birth. N/O frame horses do not have any known health defects, but have a 25% chance of producing lethal white foals if bred to another N/O horse.
Splashed white: A less-common type of nontobiano pinto pattern, splashed white coats have horizontally oriented white markings with crisp, smooth edges, and make the horse appear to have been dipped, head lowered, into white paint. The face has significant white markings, and the eyes are usually blue. Most splashed white pintos have normal hearing, but the trait is linked to congenital deafness. Some patterns identified as sabino in the USA may be splashed white.
Sabino: Sometimes confused with roan or rabicano, sabino horses possess a slight spotting pattern characterized by high white on legs, belly spots, and white markings on the face extending past the eyes. The edges of markings may be "lacy" or patches of roaning patterns standing alone or on the edges of white markings can occult. Some forms of the sabino phenotype are thought to be polygenic or a gene complex, but one form for which a DNA test exists, the sabino-1 (SB1) gene, is a dominant. Horses homozygous for SB-1 sometimes are completely white. Sabino-1 and other sabino patterns are not associated with any health defects. Though genetically unrelated to frame or splash, sabino is classified with the "overo" family of patterns by the APHA. Sabino is not necessarily classified as an overo pattern by other breed registries, particularly those whose horses do not carry the genes for other pinto patterns.
Tovero: The tovero spotting pattern is a mix of tobiano and any form of overo coloration, usually reflecting that the horse carries more than one set of genes for a spotting pattern. For example, a tovero may have a mostly white tobiano pattern on the body, but also have blue eyes with or without a white head. Horses can carry multiple spotting genes at the same time, producing characteristics of several patterns.
Dominant white: A family of sabino-like white spotting patterns, all dominant white coats predominantly inherited, analogous to human piebaldism. While some forms are associated with pure white coats and are considered "true white", not pinto, most actually show great variance in the amount of white. Over 20 different alleles are now labeled "dominant white", all of which have occurred spontaneously in the past century from nonwhite parents. Many forms of white spotting that were called "sabino" by their owners and fanciers are now classified as dominant white. The distinction between sabino and dominant white is unclear, as they are visually similar and involve closely related genes.

Related terms

Chrome: This informal term of approval for appealing white markings on the horse can be confusing, as it is also used to describe boldly patterned Appaloosas.
Solid: This is a horse that does not visibly express a pinto pattern. It may have white markings on the legs or face akin to those of nonpinto horses. Solid horses may carry one of the various pinto pattern genes. Some color breed registries accept solid horses as breeding stock, while others do not.
Breeding stock: This is a solid horse registered with one of the various registries that registers horses with pinto markings, such as the APHA which registers these horses under a special designation of "Solid Paint Bred".
Medicine hat: An uncommon pattern, the poll and ears are dark, surrounded completely by white, a true "medicine hat" pinto or paint usually has a predominantly white body, sometimes with dark coloration by the flanks, chest, and above the eyes.
Shield: A large, dark patch covers the chest, surrounded completely by white, usually on a predominantly white horse, sometimes associated with medicine hat patterning.
Cropout: This horse has spotting, though from two apparently solid-colored parents, typically within a breed whose standard does not allow pinto coloration.

"Paint" vs. "pinto"

A pinto differs from a "Paint" solely by breeding. Horses with pinto coloring and verifiable pedigrees tracing to Quarter Horses or Thoroughbreds have been named the American Paint Horse, and are recorded in a separate registry, the American Paint Horse Association. While a pinto may be of any breed or combination of breeds, and some registries for pintos may have additional restrictions (some do not register draft horses or mules, for example), a horse that is registered as an American Paint Horse must have at least one parent recorded with the APHA, and both parents must be only of registered American Quarter Horse, American Paint Horse, or Thoroughbred bloodlines. Therefore, most Paint horses may also be registered as pintos, but not all pintos are qualified to be registered as Paints.

Thus, while referring to a horse with a non-leopard spot pattern as a pinto is always correct, a spotted horse should only be called a Paint if its ancestry is known or if it displays conformation that is clearly akin to that of an American Quarter Horse. A leopard-spotted horse is usually called an Appaloosa, whether it is a registered Appaloosa or not. However, "paint" or "painted" was also an archaic word used by 19th-century writers for assorted spotted horses bred by various Plains Indian tribes, thus is occasionally used in this context when describing all types of spotted mustangs.

Organizations

A number of color breed registries encourage the breeding of pinto-colored horses, with varying registration requirements. On one hand, the Pinto Horse Association of America (PtHA) considers pinto horses recorded in their registry as a true breed, and accepts solid-colored offspring of registered pinto parents as breeding stock, though with strict requirements for full registration. The less restrictive organizations allow registration of a horse of any breed or combination of breeds with as little as three square inches of white above the knees or hocks, not including facial markings. Some pinto registries do not accept animals with draft horse or mule breeding, though others do. None accepts horses with the genetically distinct Appaloosa pattern, produced by genes in the leopard complex, and the Appaloosa registry in turn does not accept animals with pinto patterns.

Controversies

Breed registries and white markings
Many breed registries do not, or at some point in the past did not, accept "cropout" horses with spots or "excess" white for registration, believing that such animals were likely to be crossbreds, or due to a fear of producing lethal white foals. This exclusion of offspring from pedigreed parents led to the formation not only of the American Paint Horse Association, but also other pinto registries. Among the breeds that excluded such horses were the Arabian Horse and American Quarter Horse registries. Modern DNA testing, though, has revealed that some breeds do possess genes for spotting patterns, such as a non-SB-1 sabino pattern in Arabians, and sabino, overo, and tobiano in Quarter Horses. Therefore, these registries have modified their rules, allowing horses with extra white, if parentage is verified through DNA testing, to be registered. The Jockey Club's Thoroughbred registry, however, still does not officially recognize pinto as a registerable color, though it does allow white body spots to be recorded under the category of markings. The Welsh Pony and Cob Society of the UK also does not accept "piebald" or "skewbald" horses for registration.

Lethal white syndrome

As noted in the description of patterns, the frame gene is associated with a condition called lethal white syndrome or "lethal white overo", but of the overo family of patterns, only frame is associated with lethal white. Also, some horses that do not visually appear to be frame-patterned still do carry the gene. If a foal is born homozygous for the gene, it dies shortly after birth. This gene can be detected by DNA testing, and breeders can now avoid breeding two carrier horses to one another.

See also
Equine coat color
Equine coat color genetics

References

External links
Pinto Horse Registry of America
National Pinto Horse Registry (United States)
"Pinto Horse", from International Museum of the Horse
"Horse coat color tests" from the UC Davis Veterinary Genetics Lab
"Introduction to Coat Color Genetics" from Veterinary Genetics Laboratory, School of Veterinary Medicine, University of California, Davis, website accessed January 12, 2008.

Horse coat colors
Color breeds